Willie McCulloch (born 2 April 1973 in Baillieston, Glasgow) is a Scottish professional football goalkeeper.

External links

Scottish footballers
People from Baillieston
Association football goalkeepers
Airdrieonians F.C. (1878) players
Ayr United F.C. players
East Fife F.C. players
Berwick Rangers F.C. players
Stranraer F.C. players
Stenhousemuir F.C. players
Scottish Football League players
1973 births
Living people